Sinomonas albida is a Gram-positive, non-spore-forming and non-motile bacterium from the genus Sinomonas.

References

External links
Type strain of Sinomonas albida at BacDive -  the Bacterial Diversity Metadatabase

Bacteria described in 2009
Micrococcaceae